The women's halfpipe competition of the Sochi 2014 Olympics was held at Rosa Khutor Extreme Park on 12 February 2014.

Schedule
All times are (UTC+4).

Results

Qualification
The qualification was held at 2:00 p.m. (Sochi time).

QF – Qualify directly to final; QS – Qualify to semifinal; DNS – Did not start

Semifinals
The semifinals was held at 7:30 p.m. (Sochi time)

Q – Qualify to final

Final
The final was held at 10:00 p.m. (Sochi time).

Judges and officials
Judges: Ola Sundekvist, Kyoji Yokoyama, Guido Van Meel, Klara Suchanova, Phoebe Mills, Iztok Sumatic.

Officials: William Van Gilder (FIS Technical Delegate), Alexey Potapov (Competition Chief), Brandon Wong (Head Judge), Uwe Beier (FIS Race Director), Roberto Moresi (FIS Assistant Race Director), Valentin Danoskiy (Chief of Halfpipe), John Melville (Halfpipe Technical Advisor).

Notes
a  American Arielle Gold had to pull out of the competition after injuring her shoulder during a practice run and crash at Rosa Khutor Extreme Park, moments before the competition.

References

Women's snowboarding at the 2014 Winter Olympics